Alan Young (1919–2016) was a British-born Canadian-American actor.

Alan, Allan or Allen Young may also refer to:

Alan Young (lawyer), professor of law
Alan Young (Scottish footballer) (born 1955), Scottish footballer
Alan Young (Australian footballer) (born 1933), Australian footballer for Collingwood
Allan Young (1941–2009), English former footballer
Allan Young (cricketer) (1920–1974), Australian cricketer
Allen Young (1827–1915), English master mariner and explorer
Allen Young (writer) (born 1941), American journalist, author and editor

See also
Al Young (disambiguation)